KFMC-FM (106.5 FM) is a radio station licensed to Fairmont, Minnesota, serving south central Minnesota and northern Iowa with a 100,000 watt signal. The station airs a classic hits format as “106.5 Lakes FM”. KFMC was a classic rock station as "KFMC 106.5" until July 6, 2018, when the station started stunting with a loop of “Tie Me Kangaroo Down, Sport” by Rolf Harris in preparation of a new format which would debut on July 9, at Noon. At the promised time, it flipped to classic hits as “106.5 Lakes FM”. The first song on the new “106.5 Lakes FM” was “1999” by Prince. It used to be owned by Woodward Broadcasting, until City of Lakes Media acquired the station, along with its sister station KSUM and KEMJ.

References

External links
KFMC Website

Classic hits radio stations in the United States
Radio stations established in 1986
1986 establishments in Minnesota
Radio stations in Minnesota